or ardfheis ("high assembly"; plural ardfheiseanna)  is the name used by many Irish political parties for their annual party conference. The term was first used by Conradh na Gaeilge, the Irish language cultural organisation, for its annual convention.

Usage
Among the parties who use the term Ardfheis are: 

Fine Gael
Fianna Fáil
Sinn Féin
Éirígí
Green Party
Republican Sinn Féin
National Party
Workers' Party
Aontú

In Northern Ireland, the term is not used by the Social Democratic and Labour Party, or by those parties which are not Irish nationalist in outlook, such as the Alliance Party, Ulster Unionist Party and the Democratic Unionist Party.

In the Republic of Ireland, the Labour Party, Communist Party, Solidarity–People Before Profit and the Social Democrats do not use the term ardfheis.

Ard chomhairle
Many political parties who use the term ardfheis, also use the term ard chomhairle which means national executive committee. It literally translates as high council.

In Scotland
Scottish Republican Socialist Movement
Siol nan Gaidheal

References

Politics of Ireland
Politics of Scotland
Political party assemblies